Ayutha Ezhuthu is an Indian Tamil-language drama on Star Vijay. It aired from 15 July 2019 to 18 September 2020.

Plot
Indira becomes the sub collector of the village which is being dominated by Kaaliammal. While Indira wants to set things right, Kaaliammal doesn't like it and they both get into a tiff. Meanwhile, Indira falls in love with Sakthivel unaware that he is Kaaliammal's son.

Cast

Main
 Mounika as Kaaliammal ; Veerapandi, Thennarasu, Bose, Megala and Sakthi's mother
 Sreethu Nair (1-99)and Sharanya Turadi (101–258) as Indira; A Collector, Sakthi's wife and Kaaliammal's last daughter-in-law
 Amzath Khan (1-99)and Anand Selvan (101–258) as Sakthi; Kaaliammal's son and Indira's husband

Supporting
 Syamantha Kiran as Kodhai; Kaaliammal's 2nd daughter-in-law
 Priya Vishwa / Subhadhra as Janaki; Kaaliammal's 1st daughter-in-law
 Teenu as Kasthuri ; Kaaliammal's 3rd daughter-in-law (Main antagonist)
 Janani Ashok Kumar as Megala; Kaaliammal's daughter
 Azhagu as Sethuraman; Kaaliammal's husband and Veerapandi, Thennarasu, Bose, Megala and Sakthi's father 
 Sankarapandi / kamal as Bose: Kaaliammal's 3rd son
 Mahesh G as Thennarasu; Kaaliammal's 2nd son
 Unknown / Unknown as Veerapandi; Kaaliammal's 1st son
 Jeeva Ravi as Ravi; Indira's father
 Srilatha as Vijaya, Indira's mother
 Soundarya as Revathi; Indira's sister
 Santhosh Selvaraj as Arivu; Indira's brother
 Udhaya as Adiyapaadham; Indira's PA
 Rathna Raj as Thavasi; Kaaliammal's Assistant 
 Maanas Chavali as Arjun; New Collector
 Unknown as Lingam; Kasthuri's brother
 Manisha Shashikumar as Rohini; Veerapandi and Janaki's daughter
 Akhil as Suriya; Veerapandi and Janaki's son

Production
The first promo of the series was released on 12 June 2019. The serial is produced by Fiction Team.

Filming
The series is set in a rural backdrop. The initial scenes were filmed at Karaikudi.

Adaptations

References

Star Vijay original programming
2010s Tamil-language television series
Tamil-language romance television series
2019 Tamil-language television series debuts
Tamil-language television shows